John Sigred Thompson (born March 26, 1946) is an American retired professional basketball player. He played for the Indiana Pacers in two games during the 1968–69 American Basketball Association season. He recorded totals of two points, two assists, and one rebound.

References

1946 births
Living people
American men's basketball players
Baltimore Bullets (1963–1973) draft picks
Basketball players from New York (state)
Indiana Pacers players
Point guards
South Carolina Gamecocks men's basketball players